Bigg Boss 5 was the fifth season of the Tamil version of the reality television show Bigg Boss broadcast in India. The show was premiered on 3 October 2021 on Star Vijay and Disney+ Hotstar with Kamal Haasan as the host for the fifth time. While, Ramya Krishnan as appeared as a guest host for a week.

The grand finale took place on 16 January 2022, Raju Jeyamohan  emerged as the winner while VJ Priyanka Deshpande emerged as the runner up of the season. VJ Priyanka Deshpande was in The Super Singer 8 Grand Finale Live before she went to Bigg Boss Tamil Season 5. 

Niroop Nandakumar, Thamarai Selvi, Abhinay Vaddi and Suruthi Periyasamy returned as contestants in Bigg Boss Ultimate (season 1).

Production

Eye Logo
An eye, with a white cornea and pink sclera.

Bigg Boss House
Changes to other parts of the house were also visible compared to the last season. Instead of last season's aesthetic theme background with contrast sparkling colors, this season's theme mainly keeps up natural colors and followed the theme of "Nature".

Teaser 
On 4 September 2021, incorporating a paradigm shift in a Tamil wedding scene and co-relating it with the Bigg Boss house. Two more promotional teasers were released in September 2021, featuring different commentaries from Kamal Haasan.

Audience
On set for the weekend episodes after the ease of COVID-19 restrictions in Tamil Nadu.

Housemate status

Housemates

Original contestants
 Isaivani, a Gaana and folk artist
 Raju Jeyamohan, an actor known for his role in Natpuna Ennanu Theriyuma and the television series Naam Iruvar Namakku Iruvar Season 2.
 Mathumitha Raghunathan, a fashion designer, and model from Germany.
 Abishek Raaja, a narrator and YouTuber. 
 Namitha Marimuthu, a model and actress, is also the first transgender contestant to enter Bigg Boss Tamil.
 Priyanka Deshpande, an anchor, is well known for her presence in Vijay TV and her comedy humor.
 Abhinay Vaddi, the grandson of Gemini Ganesan and Savitri, an actor, appeared in the films Ramanujan (2014) and Chennai 600028 II (2016).
 Pavni Reddy, an actress, known for acting in soap operas such as Rettai Vaal Kuruvi, Chinna Thambi, and Rasaathi.
 Chinnaponnu Kumar, a folk singer, who is known for singing many folk songs.
 Nadia Chang, a model, and TikToker who hails from Malaysia.
 Imman Annachi, a stand-up comedian, host of famous kid's show and actor known for his appearance in films such as Goli Soda (2014) and Aindhaam Thalaimurai Sidha Vaidhiya Sigamani (2014).
 Suruthi Periyasamy, a runway model and actress.
 Akshara Reddy, a model known for winning the beauty pageant Miss globe 2019 and her appearance in the show Villa To Village (2018).
 Iykki Berry, a rapper and singer, and is also a physician and cosmetic surgeon.
 Thamarai Selvi, a commoner contestant and a housewife.
 Ciby Bhuvana Chandran, an actor known for his roles in films like Vanjagar Ulagam (2018) and Master (2021).
 Niroop Nandakumar, an actor, and model known for many beauty pageants.
Varun Kamal, an actor known for acting in the movie Thalaivaa.

Wildcard contestants
 Amir, a choreographer known for working in many television shows and movies.
 Sanjeev Venkat, a television and film actor known for acting in the television series such as Kanmani and Thirumathi Selvam, and in the film Master (2021).

Nominations faced

Twists 

The show routinely features tasks as part of the gameplay, following are few of the tasks:

Power Medal Task
In the third week (Day 16), housemates were given a task to steal 5 medals all representing the five basic elements in the world. The 5 housemates who manage to steal the medals win a super power to save themselves from eviction in the future and topple captaincy. However, the power can only be used once and is only available until week 10.

Notes:
 Mathumitha captured the Land Power Medal initially, transferring it to the later Original Holder of the Medal, Priyanka. As Priyanka stored it behind the House's refrigerator, her friend Niroop caught hold of the Medal afterwards.
 Ciby took the Air Power Medal at first, in front of Thamarai and Varun and later gave it to Thamarai to save herself from the nominations. However, the Medal was later stolen by Suruthi but it was destroyed before its power week as Suruthi was eliminated before the Power of Medals started.
 Pavni, Suruthi and Abhinay joined hands to take a Medal and later, Pavni caught hold of the Sky Power Medal.
 Isaivani attained the Fire Power Medal with the help of her friends, Iykki and Ciby.
 Raju, Akshara, Varun and Imman planned to take a Medal and later, Varun grabbed the Water Power Medal in the Garden Area.

Weekly summary

BB Prison
Each week, housemates who did not perform satisfactorily in the Luxury Budget Task, are sent to the Bigg Boss underground prison. The prison is devoid of any facilities except a bed and a water bucket.

 Male housemates
 Female housemates

Guest appearance

Through virtual contact

Physical appearances

 Through glass house -  T
 Direct entry  -  D     * (Who entered directly to the BB house was quarantined before entering)

Nomination table

Notes
 indicates that the housemate was directly nominated for eviction.
 indicates the housemate was immuned from nominations.
 indicates the nominees for the House Captaincy.
 indicates the House Captain.
 indicates the Former House Captain. (House Captain would have been stripped of the captaincy i.e., evicted/ejected/walked out after being nominated as the Captain)
  indicates the Trending Player.
  indicates a new wildcard contestant.
  indicates the contestant is nominated.
 indicates that the contestant has re-entered the house.
 indicates that the contestant walked out of the Bigg Boss house on their own.
  indicates the contestant has been ejected.
  indicates the contestant has been evicted.
  indicates the winner.
  indicates the first runner-up.
  indicates the second runner-up.
  indicates the third runner-up.
  indicates the fourth runner-up.

References

External links 

Tamil 5
2021 Indian television seasons
2021 Tamil-language television seasons
Kamal Haasan
Star Vijay original programming
Tamil-language television shows